Yudh (the Battle) is a solo Bharatanatyam Dance Theatre production choreographed and performed by Savitha Sastry. It is based on a short story of the same name by AK Srikanth, and featured music by the Chennai-based music composer Rajkumar Bharathi, the great grandson of the veteran poet Subramania Bharathi . The production premiered on 2 February 2013 at Mumbai’s NCPA Auditorium, and has since played all across India. The presentation was received with critical and popular acclaim.

Plot
The central premise of Yudh is based on around the story of a young girl Pavitra, who is kidnapped from a park and never heard off again. Her grieving parents have spent their lives trying to come to terms with the loss of their child. The story then shifts to offering other perspectives to this incident, through the eyes of Satan and of God. In essence, the story implies that the war between Satan and God is now fought in the minds of humans, with both of them trying to exert their influence on the human. It concludes that the winner of this war between God and Satan is eventually determined in the human mind, even though humans may not be aware of this eternal battle, or the reason why they have to endure suffering for no fault of theirs.

Cast
The characters in the performance include Satan, God, the little girl Pavitra and her parents. Savitha Sastry plays all the characters.

Production
Yudh continued Savitha’s attempts at communicating original stories not based on religion or Indian mythology through Bharatanatyam, in the lines of her previous productions Music Within and Soul Cages. Like Soul Cages, Yudh too steered clear of traditional Bharatanatyam themes of the nayika (the heroine) pining for love or pieces based on Bhakti (devotion) alone. The production used several effects from theater such as special lighting, use of voiceovers and narratives in the soundtrack.

Critical reception
Yudh received largely positive reviews from critics. In particular, the story-line, the music and the choreography was well appreciated. SD Sharma, renowned critic from the Hindustan Times called it a "scintillating solo dance spectacle."  Critic Arundhati Pattabhiraman of the Sunday Herald wrote "her art, with its breath of fresh air, is promising and insightful."  A review of Yudh in the Deccan Herald praised it highly with the words "The stunning act was an interesting amalgamation of dance, lights and music, and moved the audience to tears."  Conan Mendoza, the art critic from Deccan Chronicle was laudatory of Savitha’s attempts at changing the traditional nature of Bharatanatyam, and wrote " She is like a breath of fresh air in a circuit that focuses predominantly on adherence. She is no rebel, but charts her own course."

Credits

 Producer: AK Srikanth  
 Artistic direction and choreography: Savitha Sastry 
 Story and script: AK Srikanth  
 Music and lyrics: Rajkumar Bharathi  
 Technical direction and lighting: Victor Paulraj, Studio7 
 Sound analyst: Sai Shravanam, Resound India 
 Costume design: C A Joy, Joy Dressers
 Makeup: Huda Amini, New Delhi 
 Design and photographs: Aditya Sastry, Lost Arrows Studio, California  
 Narration: Hans Kaushik, Akhila Ramnarayan, Govind Venkatesan, Varun Iyer 
 Vocals: Krithika Arvind & Srikanth  
 Keyboard: Vijayshankar 
 Mrdangam: Vijayaraghavan 
 Tabla: Ganapathy 
 Veena: Bhavani Prasad 
 Sitar and zitar: Kishore 
 Flute: Vishnu  
 Violin: Embar Kannan; Yensone and group 
 Recording studio: Resound India, Chennai

Dance Film
In 2019, Yudh was released as a dance film and made available on a free to view digital format.

References

Bharatanatyam dance theatre productions